Ikinga is an administrative ward in Ileje District, Songwe Region, Tanzania. According to the 2002 census, the ward had a total population of 7,114.

References

Wards of Songwe Region